William Francis Buckley (May 30, 1928 – June 3, 1985) was a United States Army officer in the United States Army Special Forces, and a Central Intelligence Agency (CIA) station chief in Beirut from 1984 until 1985. His cover was as a political officer at the U.S. Embassy. He was kidnapped by the group Hezbollah in March 1984. He was held hostage and tortured by psychiatrist Aziz al-Abub. Hezbollah later claimed they executed him in October 1985, but another American hostage disputed that, believing that he died five months prior, in June. He is buried at Arlington National Cemetery and is commemorated with a star on the Memorial Wall at the CIA headquarters in Langley, Virginia.

Early life and education 
Buckley was born in Medford, Massachusetts, on May 30, 1928. He grew up on south Main Street in the neighboring town of Stoneham.  He graduated from high school there in 1947, and then joined the United States Army. He began as a military police officer and served in that capacity for two years, but then attended Officers Candidate School (OCS) and was commissioned a Second Lieutenant in Armor. He continued his military education at the Engineer Officer's Course at Fort Belvoir, Virginia, the Advanced Armor Officer's Course at Fort Knox, Kentucky, and the Intelligence School at Oberammergau, West Germany.

Career

U.S. Army 
During the Korean War, Buckley served as a company commander with the 1st Cavalry Division. Next, he returned to Boston University and completed his studies, graduating with a Bachelor of Arts degree in political science (Class of 1955; he was inducted into the U.S. Army ROTC Hall of Fame in April 2022). It was during this time that Buckley began his first employment with the Central Intelligence Agency (CIA), from 1955 to 1957. He was also employed as a librarian in the Concord, Winchester and Lexington public libraries. In 1960, Buckley joined the 320th Special Forces Detachment, which became the 11th Special Forces Group, and attended both Basic Airborne and the Special Forces Officers Course. He was assigned as an A-Detachment commander and later as a B-Detachment commander. Colonel Buckley served in Vietnam with the U.S. Military Assistance Command, Vietnam, or MACV, as a senior advisor to the South Vietnamese Army.

Central Intelligence Agency 

In 1965 (or 1963, according to one source), Buckley rejoined the CIA in what is now called the Special Activities Division. He may have been recruited by Ted Shackley, joining his Secret Team that had been involved with Edwin Wilson, Thomas Clines, Carl Jenkins, Rafael Quintero, Félix Rodriguez and Luis Posada Carriles, in the CIA's Phoenix Program. Leslie Cockburn pointed out in her book, Out of Control (1987), that Buckley was involved in approving CIA assassinations undertaken by the Shackley organizations. In his book, Prelude to Terror (2005) Joseph Trento claims that Buckley was "one of Shackley's oldest and dearest friends."

Buckley may have been working for the CIA while in Mexico in 1963, but this is unconfirmed. His CIA employment kept him in South Vietnam from 1965 to 1970, and he was promoted in his military capacity to lieutenant colonel in May 1969. After leaving Vietnam, he served in Zaire (1970–1972), Cambodia (1972), Egypt (1972–1978), and Pakistan (1978–1979).

In 1983, Buckley succeeded Ken Haas as the Beirut Station Chief/Political Officer at the U.S. Embassy. Buckley was successfully rebuilding the network of agents lost in and due to the bombing of the U.S. Embassy; after the Marine Corps barracks bombing in October 1983, the Islamist group Hezbollah wrongly announced that they had also killed the CIA station chief (they did not yet know the station chief was Buckley) in the blast; their announcement was the first real indication that he was on a Hezbollah "hit list."

Kidnapping and death 
Historically, Lebanon had always been a politically and socially unstable country but throughout 1983 this instability increased dramatically and the Shi'ite population of Lebanon became increasingly radicalized and started to target Westerners and Western-owned infrastructure such as embassies.
Within this backdrop, on March 16, 1984, Buckley was kidnapped by Hezbollah from his apartment building when he was leaving for work. It was thought that one of the reasons he was kidnapped along with two other Americans at different times in Beirut was because of the upcoming trial of 17 Iranian-backed militants that was about to begin in Kuwait. Army Major General Carl Stiner had warned Buckley that he was in danger, but Buckley told him that "I have a pretty good intelligence network. I think I'm secure." However, according to Stiner, Buckley continued to live in his apartment and travel the same route to and from work every day.

David Barkay, a former officer in Israel's intelligence unit 504, asserts that a spy from Hezbollah delivered a note to his operatives (Barkay among them) six days before the kidnapping occurred. The note contained a message from Imad Mughniyeh to a Hezbollah team that had been training for a kidnapping operation for months. The message instructed the team to prepare for the operation, which was set to take place in a couple of days. The note identified the target of the operation as "an American senior intelligence officer." Barkay adds that it's possible that the information about the impending kidnapping did not reach the CIA due to an "egotistical" dispute between the Mossad and Israel's Military Intelligence Directorate.

William Casey, who was by then the director of Central Intelligence, asked Ted Shackley for help in securing Buckley's release. Three weeks after Buckley's abduction, President Ronald Reagan signed National Security Decision Directive 138. This directive was drafted by Oliver North and outlined plans on how to get the American hostages released from Iran and to "neutralize" alleged "terrorist threats" from countries such as Nicaragua. This new secret counter-terrorist task force was to be headed by Shackley's old friend, General Richard Secord. This was the beginning of the Iran–Contra affair, which culminated in the exchange of missiles for the release of hostages.

On November 22, 1985, Ted Shackley, Buckley's friend and recruiter, traveled to the Atlantic Hotel in Hamburg, where he met General Manouchehr Hashemi, the former head of SAVAK's counterintelligence division. Also at the meeting on November 22 was Manucher Ghorbanifar. According to the report of this meeting that Shackley sent to the CIA, Ghorbanifar had "fantastic" contacts with Iran, but the CIA had designated him one year earlier as a "fabricator". At the meeting, Shackley told Hashemi and Ghorbanifar that the United States was willing to discuss arms shipments in exchange for the four Americans kidnapped in Lebanon, although Buckley was already dead at this point.

Major General Carl Stiner stated that "Buckley's kidnapping had become a major CIA concern. Not long after his capture, his agents either vanished or were killed. It was clear that his captors had tortured him into revealing the network of agents he had established." According to the United States, Buckley had undergone 15 months of torture by Hezbollah before his death. After Buckley's kidnapping, three videos of Buckley being tortured were sent to the CIA in Athens. Interpreters noticed puncture marks indicating he was injected with narcotics. According to several sources, as a result of his torture, he signed a 400-page statement detailing his CIA activities. In a video taken approximately seven months after the kidnapping, his appearance was described as follows:
Buckley was close to a gibbering wretch. His words were often incoherent; he slobbered and drooled and, most unnerving of all, he would suddenly scream in terror, his eyes rolling helplessly and his body shaking. The CIA consensus was that he would be blindfolded and chained at the ankles and wrists and kept in a cell little bigger than a coffin.

On October 4, 1985, Islamic Jihad announced that it had executed Buckley. The United States National Security Council acknowledged in an unclassified note that Buckley probably died on June 3, 1985, of a heart attack. Buckley's remains were recovered by Major Jens Nielsen (Royal Danish Army) attached to the United Nations Observation Group Beirut on December 27, 1991, after they were dumped on a road near Beirut airport. His body was returned to the United States on December 28, 1991, and was buried at Arlington National Cemetery, in Arlington, Virginia.

After Buckley's death, Hezbollah's concern for other hostages' health increased; Hezbollah captors inquired about the hostages' health and well-being.

Legacy 

An agency memorial service was held in August 1987 to commemorate his death. A public memorial service was held with full military honors at Arlington on May 13, 1988, just short of three years after his presumed death date. At the service, attended by more than 100 colleagues and friends, CIA Director William H. Webster eulogized Buckley, saying, "Bill's success in collecting information in situations of incredible danger was exceptional, even remarkable."

There is a small park (dedicated May 30, 2010) with a memorial in his memory in the main square of his hometown of Stoneham, Massachusetts.

Awards and decorations 
Among Buckley's decorations and awards are the Silver Star, Soldier's Medal, Bronze Star Medal with "V" Device, two Purple Hearts, the Meritorious Service Medal, the Combat Infantryman's Badge, and the Parachutist Badge. He also received the Vietnam Cross of Gallantry with bronze star from the Army of the Republic of Vietnam. Among his CIA awards are the Intelligence Star, Exceptional Service Medallion and Distinguished Intelligence Cross.
Among Buckley's civilian awards are the Freedom Foundation Award for Lexington Green Diorama, Collegium and Academy of Distinguished Alumni Boston University. The William F. Buckley Memorial Park in Stoneham, Massachusetts, is dedicated to his memory. The 51st star on the CIA Memorial Wall represents him, surrounded by about 132 other stars (as of January 2021) representing CIA officers killed in the line of duty. Approximately 35 of the stars are for unnamed agents whose identities have not been revealed for national security reasons. His name and year of death are recorded in the "Book of Honor" at the wall. The CIA awarded him the Distinguished Intelligence Cross, an Intelligence Star, and an Exceptional Service Medal, but has not said whether any of these were issued posthumously (although at least one award of the Exceptional Service Medal must have been made posthumously).

Personal life 
According to the biographical information distributed by the CIA, Buckley was "an avid reader of politics and history" and "a collector and builder of miniature soldiers." The latter hobby enabled him to become a principal artisan in the creation of a panorama at the Lexington Battlefield Tourist Center near his native Medford, Massachusetts. The press release also said he owned an antique shop and was an amateur artist and a collector of fine art. It called him "a very private and discreet individual."

See also 

 William R. Higgins (1945–1990)
 Imad Mughniyah (1962–2008)

References

Notes

Citations

Sources

Further reading 
 
 

1928 births
1985 deaths
Kidnappings by Islamists
American spies
Assassinated American people
Burials at Arlington National Cemetery
People of the Central Intelligence Agency
CIA personnel of the Vietnam War
People from Medford, Massachusetts
United States Army officers
American people murdered abroad
Recipients of the Soldier's Medal
Recipients of the Silver Star
United States Army personnel of the Korean War
United States Army personnel of the Vietnam War
American torture victims
Recipients of the Intelligence Star
People murdered in Lebanon
Murdered CIA agents
Military personnel from Massachusetts